The men's 1500 metres event at the 1978 Commonwealth Games was held on 11 and 12 August at the Commonwealth Stadium in Edmonton, Alberta, Canada.

Medalists

Results

Heats
Held on 11 August

Qualification: First 5 in each heat (Q) and the next 2 fastest (q) qualify for the final.

Final
Held on 12 August

References

Heats results (The Canberra Times)
Final results (The Canberra Times)

Athletics at the 1978 Commonwealth Games
1978